Whataroa is a small township in southern Westland on the West Coast of New Zealand's South Island. It is located on the western bank of the Whataroa River, with the village of Te Taho on the other side.  passes through Whataroa on its route from Ross to the Franz Josef Glacier.

The population of Whataroa and its surrounding area was 288 in the 2013 census, a decrease of 117 from 2006.

Whataroa is located in an agricultural area where dairying is the primary activity. The town contains establishments such as a school, two churches, and a dairy and tearooms. 

It once included a maternity hospital and a number of schools.

Attractions

Whataroa hosts the South Westland A&P Show annually in February. Founded in 1951, events include equestrian competitions, dairy cattle judging, dog trials, trade displays and various family entertainment.

The Woodham Shield is an annual rugby competition in which Whataroa and neighboring towns, Franz- Fox- Haast, Hari Hari and Ross, compete against each other for possession of the shield.

History
Whataroa was the site of cattle sales twice a year from 1875, serving farmers from around South Westland. The last mob of cattle was driven to Whataroa in 1961.

A dairy factory was established at Whataroa before World War I.

Churches

Our Lady of the Woods

Our Lady of the Woods is a Catholic church located at 7 Whataroa Flat Road, Whataroa, within the South Westland parish of Our Lady of the Woods.

The  site for the church and presbytery was donated by Mrs Butler, whose husband had gifted the site for the previous Catholic church in Whataroa. The Bishop of Christchurch, Matthew Brodie, laid the foundation stone on 22 April 1934, and the church was blessed and dedicated later that year, on 30 September, by Bishop Brodie.

Mass is held at Our Lady of the Woods twice monthly, on the first and third Sundays.

St Luke's
The church was dedicated by Bishop Julius on 10 July 1919, during his annual visit to the West Coast. The church includes a three-light memorial stained-glass window behind the altar, donated by the Burrough family in memory of Joseph Burrough who died while serving in France during World War I.

Education
The school was established in 1879 and celebrated its 125th jubilee in 2004.

Hydrothermal activity
Whataroa sits on the Alpine Fault, a seismically active area. In 2017 scientists reported they had discovered beneath Whataroa "extreme" hydrothermal activity which "could be commercially very significant".

References

External links

Whataroa Community Association website
South Westland A&P Show
Whataroa School

Westland District
Populated places in the West Coast, New Zealand